National Route 126 is a national highway of Japan connecting Chōshi, Chiba and Inage-ku, Chiba in Japan, with a total length of .

References

126
Roads in Chiba Prefecture